The following is a list of some of the National Parks in Uruguay.

Wetlands/coastal 
 Lagoons on Uruguay's east coast. Classified as a wetland of international significance under the Ramsar Convention.
 Laguna de rocha. Lagoon in Rocha.
 Castillos Lagoon. Freshwater lagoon in Rocha.
 Garzon Lagoon. Semi-freshwater lagoon in Rocha and Maldonado.
 Santa Teresa National Park. Includes beaches, forests and the Fort of Santa Teresa.
 Cabo Polonio. Includes beaches and sand dunes.

Central Hill Country
 Lunarejo Valley. Located between Rivera and Artigas (on the border with Brazil). Native grassland, ferns and hill scrub, with small pockets of sub-tropical vegetation in the valleys.
 Quebrada de los Cuervos. Located near Treinta y Tres. Includes canyons and a sub-tropical forest in the bottom of the gorge.
 Arequita National Park. Includes a large round mesa of volcanic rock and forests.

Uruguay River
 Esteros de Farrapos National Park. Includes 24 islands, covering 174.96 km2. Classified under the Ramsar Convention as a Wetland of International Significance.

Caves
 Palace Cave in Flores. The geology dates from the Late Cretaceous period and is composed of sandstone, which formed during the Paleocene. Classified as a National Park in 2013.

References

Uruguay
National parks
National parks